This is a list of Groups in the United States Air Force that do not belong to a host wing.

The last level of independent operation is the group level. When an organization is not part of the primary mission of the base it will be made an independent group. They may report to a wing or they may be completely independent (the 317th Airlift Group at Dyess Air Force Base). They may also be organized as an expeditionary unit, independent but too small to warrant a wing designation. The organization of the independent group is usually similar to the operations group, but with a few squadrons or flight from the support side added to make the organization more self-sufficient, but not large enough to become a wing.

Current Groups

Inactive Groups
The 1st, 2nd, and 9th Aeromedical Evacuation Groups all previously existed.

The 427th Special Operations Training Squadron (Tail Code IJ) at England Air Force Base, Louisiana, flew the Cessna A-37 Dragonfly (OA-37B FAC variant) from 1970–1972, assigned to the provisional 4410th Special Operations Training Group, Tactical Air Command. 

The 4450th Standardization Evaluation Group (SEG) was activated in the early 1960s.

Colonel Abner M. Aust served as Deputy Commander and then Commander of the 6002nd Standardization Evaluation Group at Kadena Air Base, Okinawa, from September 1963 to June 1965. The group was inactivated on 20 November 1967. 

The 7382nd Guided Missile Group (Tactical) was stationed at Hahn Air Base, West Germany, in the 1960s before being replaced by the 701st Tactical Missile Wing.

References

Sources
USAF Historical Research Agency list of current Groups and Wings.

Groups